While many notable bands go through several lineup changes throughout their careers, this list of artists who left right before their bands became famous only lists members who quit or were fired from a band shortly before the band achieved mainstream commercial success.

Artists who were only meant to be temporary stand-ins in their bands should not be included in this list. The bands the listed artists left must be notable, can be from any genre of music, and include vocal groups whose members do not play instruments. Because these artists left before their former bands' mainstream breakthrough, they should not be considered part of their former bands' "classic" lineups.

Notable examples
 
Of these "nearly-men", drummer Pete Best, who was fired from the Beatles in 1962, just a year before "Beatlemania" started, has been cited as the best-known archetype. Best has since become "famous for not being famous".

Jason Everman left two bands that went on to become famous: he was fired from Nirvana in 1989 and Soundgarden in 1990. According to The New York Times, Everman "wasn't just Pete Best ... He was Pete Best twice."

Some of these artists eventually went on to find mainstream success in another band or as a soloist. For example, Metallica's original lead guitarist, Dave Mustaine, formed his own thrash metal band Megadeth in 1983 after he was fired from his former band. While Metallica went on to achieve massive commercial success, Mustaine's Megadeth also enjoyed commercial success, selling 50 million records worldwide.

Alphabetic list

Artists are listed alphabetically by their surname, followed by the band they left, their former role in the band, the year they left, and the year their former band achieved mainstream success. Additional comments on the way the artist left (fired or quit) and their replacement, if any, may be added at the end. All entries are referenced with reliable sources.

References 

Lists of musicians